The Senate Finance Subcommittee on Taxation and IRS Oversight is one of the six subcommittees within the Senate Committee on Finance.

Members, 118th Congress

References

https://www.finance.senate.gov/chairmans-news/hatch-wyden-announce-finance-subcommittee-assignments-for-115th-congress-

External links
Committee on Finance, Subcommittee membership page

Finance Taxation, IRS Oversight, and Long-Term Growth